Euripus is a genus of butterflies in the family Nymphalidae. The three species in the genus are native to South and Southeast Asia.

Species
Euripus consimilis (Westwood, 1850) – painted courtesan
Euripus nyctelius (Doubleday, 1845) – courtesan
Euripus robustus Wallace, 1869 – Wallace's courtesan

External links
"Euripus Doubleday, [1848]" at Markku Savela's ''Lepidoptera and Some Other Life Forms

Apaturinae
Taxa named by Henry Doubleday
Nymphalidae genera